Eskişehir is an electoral district of the Grand National Assembly of Turkey. It elects six members of parliament (deputies) to represent the province of the same name for a four-year term by the D'Hondt method, a party-list proportional representation system.

Members 
Population reviews of each electoral district are conducted before each general election, which can lead to certain districts being granted a smaller or greater number of parliamentary seats. Eskişehir has remained relatively stable, electing six MPs since 1999.

General elections

2015

2011

Presidential elections

2014

References 

Electoral districts of Turkey
Politics of Eskişehir Province